Hara may refer to:

Art and entertainment 
 Hara (band), a Romanian pop-band
 Hara (film), a 2014 Kannada-language drama film
 Hara (sculpture), a 1989 artwork by Deborah Butterfield
 Goo Hara (1991-2019), South Korean idol singer

Mythology 
 Hara (Bible), a Biblical place name
 Hara (Hinduism), an early name for Shiva
 Harā Bərəzaitī, a legendary mountain in Persian mythology
 Hara Huna Kingdom, an ancient Chinese tribe close to Himalayas mentioned in the epic Mahabharata

Places
 Hara Arena, a 5,500-seat multi-purpose arena in Trotwood, Ohio, United States
 Hara Bay, the mouth of the Valgejõgi River in the Gulf of Finland
 Hara Castle (原城, Hara jō), a castle in Hizen Province, Japan
 Hara, Ethiopia, a town in central Ethiopia
 Hara forests, a forest in southern Iran
 Hara Island, an island in the Hara Bay off the northern coast of Estonia
 Hara, Harju County, a village in Kuuslalu Parish, Harju County, Estonia
 Hara, Lääne County, a village in Noarootsi Parish, Lääne County, Estonia
 Hara, Nagano, a village in Suwa District, Nagano, Japan
 Hara Seghira Synagogue (Arabic: معبد حارة صغيرة), a synagogue on the island of Djerba, Tunisia
 Hara Station (disambiguation), various places
 Hara University (Pashto: حرا پوهنتون), a university located in the eastern province of Khost, Afghanistan
 Bizen-Hara Station (備前原駅, Bizen-Hara-eki), a train station in Okayama, Okayama Prefecture, Japan
 Herat, an ancient city in South Western Afghanistan

Other uses 
 4640 Hara, a main-belt asteroid
 Hara, the botanical author abbreviation of Japanese mycologist Kanesuke Hara
 Hara (fish), a fish genus in the order Siluriformes
 Hara (given name)
 Hara (surname)
 Hara (tanden) (腹), a Japanese technical term used in medicine and martial arts referring to a specific place on or the whole of the lower abdomen
 Avicennia marina, a species of mangrove known as the hara tree in southern Iran
 Hawai'i Academy of Recording Arts
 Hyperbolic absolute risk aversion, a term in economics
 Shiva, a god in Hinduism

See also
 Haras (disambiguation)
 O'Hara (disambiguation), an Irish surname